Robert "Bob" Diry (in Austria Robert Dirry, born 12 July 1884 in Vienna, Austria, death unknown) was an Austrian middleweight world champion 1908 in wrestling. After his migration to America he tried boxing. He was defeated by George Ashe (boxer) in 1913 in a knockout.

References

External links 
 Dirry in the database of the University of Leipzig
 

Middleweight boxers
Austrian male boxers
1884 births
Year of death missing
Austro-Hungarian emigrants to the United States